Shirley Borhauer (October 2, 1926 – December 10, 2013) was an American politician who served in the Arkansas House of Representatives from 2001 to 2007.

References

1926 births
2013 deaths
Politicians from Chicago
Republican Party members of the Arkansas House of Representatives
Women state legislators in Arkansas